Eero Ilmari Salminen (18 October 1933 – 6 June 1997) was a Finnish athlete. He competed in the men's high jump at the 1960 Summer Olympics.

References

External links
 

1933 births
1997 deaths
Athletes (track and field) at the 1960 Summer Olympics
Finnish male high jumpers
Olympic athletes of Finland
People from Kokkola
Sportspeople from Central Ostrobothnia